The 2018 Arizona Secretary of State election took place on November 6, 2018, to elect the Secretary of State of Arizona, concurrently with the election of Arizona's Class I U.S. Senate seat, as well as other elections to the United States Senate in other states and elections to the United States House of Representatives and various state and local elections.

Incumbent Michele Reagan was first elected in 2014 and ran for re-election. She was defeated in the Republican primary by Steve Gaynor. State senator Katie Hobbs defeated Gaynor in the general election by a small margin, becoming the first Democratic Secretary of State since Richard Mahoney was elected in 1990.

The race was rated "Likely Republican" by Governing.com, but this did not come to fruition as Katie Hobbs pulled off an upset win which, alongside Democrats' victory in the concurrent Senate election, established Arizona's role as a key battleground state.

Republican primary

Candidates

Nominee 
Steve Gaynor, businessman

Eliminated in primary
Michele Reagan, incumbent secretary of state

Declined
Kevin Gibbons, home loan officer

Results

Democratic primary

Candidates

Nominee 
Katie Hobbs, minority leader of the Arizona Senate

Not on the ballot 
Leslie Pico, businesswoman

Withdrew 
Mark Robert Gordon, attorney

Results

General election

Predictions

Polling

Results

By county

References 

Secretary of State
Arizona
Arizona Secretary of State elections